2-NBDG is a fluorescent tracer used for monitoring glucose uptake into living cells; it consists of a glucosamine molecule substituted with a 7-nitrobenzofurazan fluorophore at its amine group. It is widely referred to a fluorescent derivative of glucose, and it is used in cell biology to visualize uptake of glucose by cells.  Cells that have taken up the compound fluoresce green.

2-NBDG is similar to radiolabeled glucose in that both can be used to detect glucose transport.  Unlike radiolabeled glucose, 2-NBDG is compatible with fluorescence techniques such as a fluorescent microscopy, flow cytometry, and fluorimetry

The compound is taken up by a variety of mammalian, plant, and microbial cells   In mammalian cells, one transporter for 2-NBDG is supposed to be GLUT2., but this has been recently challenged (see below). In bacterial cells, the predominant transporter is the mannose phosphotransferase system.  Cells that lack these or other compatible transporters do not take up 2-NBDG.

Like glucose, 2-NBDG is transported according to Michaelis–Menten kinetics.  However, transport of 2-NBDG has a lower Vmax  (maximum rate), and thus the rate of transport is generally slower than glucose.

Once taken up, the compound is metabolized to a non-fluorescent derivative, as shown in Escherichia coli.  The identity and further metabolism of this non-fluorescent derivative has not been established.

Three articles published between 2020 and 2022 indicate that the uptake of 2-NBDG is independent of Glut transporters and as such, it does not reflect true glucose intake like radiolabeled glucose would

References 

Hexosamines
Deoxy sugars
Aldohexoses